The Ownerz is the sixth studio album by the hip-hop duo Gang Starr, and the last released during Guru’s lifetime. It was released in June 24, 2003, by Virgin. It was well-received critically and boasts four singles, "Skills", "Rite Where U Stand", "Nice Girl, Wrong Place", and "Same Team, No Games".

Track listing
"Intro (HQ, Goo, Panch)"  – 0:46
"Put Up or Shut Up" (featuring Krumb Snatcha)  – 3:15
"Werdz from the Ghetto Child" (featuring Smiley the Ghetto Child)  – 1:09
"Sabotage"  – 2:22
"Rite Where U Stand" (featuring Jadakiss)  – 3:37
"Skills"  – 3:17
"Deadly Habitz"  – 4:12
"Nice Girl, Wrong Place" (featuring Boy Big)  – 3:32
"Peace of Mine"  – 3:01
"Who Got Gunz" (featuring Fat Joe & M.O.P.)  – 3:36
"Capture (Militia Pt. 3)" (featuring Big Shug & Freddie Foxxx)  – 3:23
"PLAYTAWIN"  – 3:11
"Riot Akt"  – 4:04
"(Hiney)"  – 1:31
"Same Team, No Games" (featuring NYG'z & Hannibal Stax)  – 3:44
"In This Life..." (featuring Snoop Dogg & Uncle Reo)  – 3:03
"The Ownerz"  – 2:57
"Zonin'"  – 2:54
"Eulogy"  – 2:54
"Natural" [Japan Bonus Track]  – 2:46
"Tha Squeeze" [Japan Bonus Track]  – 3:29

In other media
The track "Same Team, No Games" is featured in DJ Premier's playlist for the 2015 video game NBA 2K16.

The Track "The Squeeze" is previously featured on the Training Day Soundtrack.

Charts

References

2003 albums
Gang Starr albums
Albums produced by DJ Premier
Albums produced by Guru
Virgin Records albums